Jaykumar Rawal is a member of the 13th Maharashtra Legislative Assembly. He represents the Sindkheda Constituency.
Jaykumar Rawal is a descendant of the royal family of Dondaicha Sansthan and his grandfather Sahakar Maharshi Dadasaheb Rawal was the first MLA in 1952.
He belongs to the Bharatiya Janata Party. Rawal was also Member of Legislative Assembly from Sindkheda in 2009. Rawal was one of the general secretaries of the Bharatiya Janata Party Maharashtra State unit in 2013. He is a fourth term Member of the Maharashtra Legislative Assembly in 2004, 2009, 2014 & 2019.

http://www.tezsamachar.com/jaikumar-rawal-elect-the-election-in-shindkheda/

Jaykumar was appointed Cabinet Minister in Expansion of Devendra Fadnavis Ministry and appointed Tourism, Employment Guarantee Scheme Minister on 8 July 2016.
Jaykumar Rawal was appointed Food, Drugs and Protocol Minister in the government of Maharashtra on 4 June 2019.

Controversy

Positions held

Achievements 

Co- ordinator – Youth Forum, All party Young Legislator Association of Maharashtra consisting of 72 MLA's of all parties
(From 2004 till date)
Student Representative as First Asian in Cardiff University England (UK).
Played key role in establishing BJP in the district with very significant control over numerous local, political, social, educational, co-operative bodies
For the first time in Dhule Zilla Parishad, BJP played a major role in establishing Shiv Sena in 2008 
Elected BJP mayor at Dhule Municipal Corporation in 2011 for the first time in history.
 Shindakheda Taluka BJP established power in Shindkheda taluka Municipalities, Panchayat Samiti, Bazar Samiti, Nagar Panchayat and Purchase and Sales Association.
Got 2 M.P.s elected in Dhule & Nandurbar. Nandurbar M.P. defeated congress sitting minister, 2014 
 Recently, BJP established power in Dhule Zilla Parishad, Dhule Municipal Corporation, DDC bank etc.

Within BJP 

National Secretary, BJYM Delhi.
general secretary, BJP, Maharashtra (2013)

. Vice President, BJP Maharashtra State

Legislative 

Corporator, Municipality of Dondaicha - 2001-2004 
Member, Maharashtra Legislative Assembly – 2004–2009
Member, Maharashtra Legislative Assembly – Re-elected in 2009
Member, Maharashtra Legislative Assembly – Re-elected third Term in 2014
Member, Maharashtra Legislative Assembly - Re-elected fourth Term in 2019
 Tourism, Employment Guarantee Scheme Cabinet Minister of Maharashtra since 8 July 2016-June 2019.
  Food and drugs administration, civil supplies and consumer protection, Tourism Cabinet Minister of Maharashtra since 4 June 2019

See also
 Devendra Fadnavis ministry (2014–)

References

Maharashtra MLAs 2009–2014
Maharashtra MLAs 2014–2019
People from Dhule
Bharatiya Janata Party politicians from Maharashtra
Living people
1975 births
Maharashtra MLAs 2019–2024
People from Dhule district
People from Maharashtra